Spasell is a slang of Insubric language, spoken until the 19th century by inhabitants of Vallassina, when they used to go out from the valley for business and they didn't want to be understood by the people. It is characterized by code-words conventionally defined basing on characteristics of the thing or on onomatopoeias; other words have an unknown origin. It has been noted by Carlo Mazza, vicar of Asso, in his book  of 1796. He informs us that several slangs have been created in the time, because in the time the words were introduced in the current language, reducing the differences between "official" language and "secret" language. After a list of terms, the vicar proposes, as example, the translation of Pater Noster in this language, evidencing that it's totally incomprehensible also by the Insubric speakers. There are various similar or identical slangs in many localities of Insubria, like Valtellina and Milan.

Some Spasell words in Classical Milanese orthography:

albarej - eggs (Vallassinese of Asso: ööf)
arton - bread (pan)
astregg - omelet (fritada)
bajaff	- weapon (arma)
bald - day (dì)
ballina - hour (ura)
bell - sun (suu)
bella - moon (lüna)
belledra - sheep (pégura, barina)
bighês - lover (muruus)
boffaroeu - firearm (s'ciòp)
bolla - people, community (géent)
boschiroeura - hazelnut (nisciöla)
bosin - master (padrón)
bronza	- bell (campana)
bruna - night (nòcc)
brunej	- eyes  (öcc)
calcant - beggar (pitòch)
calcosa - street (straa)
Capellura - Our Lady (Madòna)
Capelluu - God (Signuur)
cer - white (biaanch)
croeuggia - house (cà)
croeulla - storm (tempèsta)
daga - sword (spada)
degoeuj - salad (nsalada)
fangôs - shoes (scaarp)
faree - black (négher)
ficcà el vel - to go (ndà)
fogatta - red (rós)
foja - fear (pagüra, strimizi)
follon - fear (pagüra, strimizi)
fortin - vinegar (asée)
fraina - snow (néef)
fratessa - pocket (sacòcia)
ghisalba - blind (òorp)
gialdin - coin (zechin)
gianderoeu - peach (pèrsega)
gnifell - son (bagaj)
griera - prison (prisón)
gringaja - bell (campana)
inciappinà - to become drunk (imbriagas)
infioeura - chestnut (castègna)
ingalmì - to understand (capì)
lescia - garlic (aj)
levesa - chestnut (castègna)
loffi - bad (gram)
longôs - year (ann, agn)
longosin - month (mées)
lumà - to see (vedè)
lumart - mirror (spècc)
luscia	- water, rain (aqua)
luscià	- to cry (piaanc, caragnà)
luscia del Capelluu - blessed water (aqua santa)
luscion piatt - sea (maar)
mager - good (bón)
manìa - woman (dòna)
masett	- father (pà)
masett de la luscia - cloud (nìula)
masetta - mother (mam)
mugenga - cow (vaca)
muginghera - cowshed (stala)
naja de tamoeu - devil (diàul)
nold - grandfather (nònu)
percà - to see (vedè)
picch - hammer (martèl)
pisto - priest (préet)
prumm - pig (purcèl)
quella di sciatt - earth, ground (tèra)
rabbaja - polenta (pulénta)
refald - hot (caalt)
refilà - to give (dà)
ruscà - to do (fà)
ruspanda - hen (gaìna)
ruspandon - cock (gal)
saltarella - hare (légura)
sbalada - death (mòort)
sbeg - bread (pan)
sbelledrà - to sing (cantà)
sbertì - to kill (mazà)
sbertidor - executioner (bòja)
sboja-tambell - notary (nudaar)
scabi - wine (vin)
scabià	- to drink (béef)
scajà - to pay (pagà)
sciucchesta - pint (pinta)
sciucch - mug
scoffenà - to work (laurà)
scoloeu - hat (capèl)
scoloeu de la croeuggia - roof (tècc)
scovagioeu - handkerchief (panèt)
seguacc - lake (laach)
sgorattin - bird (üsèl)
sguinz	- fish (pès)
silvestra - candlelight (lüm)
slenza	- rain (aqua)
spiazz	- priest (préet)
spiazz de la bolla - vicar (cürat, prevòst)
spolverenta - flour (farina)
stanzià - to be, to have, to stay (vès, vèch, stà)
stobald - today (incöö)
sudà - to inebriate (imbriagas)
szabolda - to be silent (tasè)
tabacca - beard (barba)
tabacchin - (pizèt)
tambell - cards (caart)
tambosna - pumpkin (züca)
tamera	- night (nòcc)
tavolà	- to come (vignì)
tavolà la fraina - to snow (vignì la néef)
tisell	- cold (frècc)
toff - gun (s'ciupetada)
traversa - tablecloth (tuaja)
tubà - to say (dì)
vedrosin - glass (bicéer)
vertera - door (pòrta)

Bibliography 
Carlo Mazza, Memorie storiche della Vallassina, 1796 (PARTE SECONDA, CAPO XII)

Western Lombard language
Cant languages
Italian slang